Rudy Youngblood (born  September 21, 1982), is an American actor, musician, dancer, and artist.

Early life and background 
Born in Belton, Texas, Rudy Youngblood grew up with two younger sisters. They were supported by their mother, who Rudy identifies as being of Comanche descent. Rudy has stated that his biological father was of Yaqui background. His adoptive father was of Cree descent. Growing up, Rudy went by Rudy Gonzales, using his stepfather's surname.

David A. Yeagley told the L.A. Times, "He has no Indian blood in him that anyone can validate." At the time, Youngblood's website stated, "Rudy is from the Tahchawwickah Comanche family, his father is the late Preston Tahchawwickah. He is adopted Cree." Comanche Nation spokeswoman Jolene Schonchin states that Youngblood "is not on our tribal rolls, but he does have Comanche blood" through his father Preston Tahchawwickah. Other members of Preston Tahchawwickah's family questioned that. Dawn Tahchawwickah, daughter of Preston Tahchawwickah, stated that Youngblood was "only a family friend" and "He is nothing to my father," while other children of Preston have said Youngblood is their brother. Youngblood told the L.A. Times that, "Preston Tahchawwickah was not his biological father but his ceremonially adoptive father" and that it was his mother who had Comanche ancestry.

Education and early career 
At the age of ten, he started working at construction jobs and learned skills and stories from the men. He has learned carpentry, brick laying, and other skills. He went to local schools and was competitive in boxing and track athletics while attending Belton High School. He frequently went to movies and became a fan of film. Upon graduation, he was offered scholarships to major colleges in both art and track and field, but he chose Native dance instead. He has performed with the American Indian Dance Theatre.

Acting career

Going to a general casting call, Youngblood was selected by the director Mel Gibson to play the leading role of Jaguar Paw in the epic film Apocalypto (2006), in which he also performed his own stunts. He learned the Yucatec Maya language in order to appear as a tribesman in the film, in which all dialogue was in Maya. For his work in the film, he won the Best Actor award at the 15th annual First Americans in the Arts awards.

Personal life and activism
Youngblood has participated in HIV activism, engaging in AIDS walks and visiting HIV-positive children in hospitals — in particular to draw attention to the rate of HIV infection in the Native community. Having seen a family member die of AIDS-related complications, he felt it important to "give back and make a difference" and has spoken out about the importance of education in combating ignorance around HIV/AIDS, alcoholism, drug abuse and child abuse. Having grown up looking after his sisters as a result of his mother's struggles with alcoholism, he regained a close relationship with her subsequently.

Filmography

References

External links
 
 "Undaunted Spirit", A&U Magazine, November 2007

1982 births
Living people
21st-century American male actors
Musicians from Texas
American people of Comanche descent
American people of Yaqui descent
Belton High School (Belton, Texas) alumni
Male actors from Texas
People from Belton, Texas
HIV/AIDS activists